LG Optimus L3  is a slate smartphone designed and manufactured by LG Electronics. The Optimus L3 runs on Android 2.3 Gingerbread. The LG Optimus L3 is the budget-range handset in the L series.

Hardware
LG Optimus L3 comes with an 800 MHz Single-Core Qualcomm MSM7225A CPU and an Adreno 200 GPU. It has a 3.2 inch TFT  capacitive touch-screen, displaying 262,144 colours at QVGA resolution. Below the screen are two touch-sensitive capacitive buttons for navigating around Android (menu and back) which will light up when the user presses them.  There is also a small, sharp-edged physical button to bring the user back to the home screen. The phone's single speaker is mounted on the front.

Variants
In different markets, LG offers four different variants of this phone, with model numbers E400, E400F, E400R, and E405. The differences are: E400, E400F and E400R are identical except E400F has front-facing camera while the other does not; E400R is produced for Rogers and E405 is a dual-SIM version. (others have standard single-SIM version).

See also
 LG Optimus
 List of LG mobile phones
 Comparison of smartphones

References
 LG Optimus L3 review|CNET.com - http://reviews.cnet.co.uk/mobile-phones/lg-optimus-l3-review-50007109/ 
 LG Optimus L3 E400 Specifications - http://www.gsmarena.com/lg_optimus_l3_e400-4461.php

Android (operating system) devices
LG Electronics smartphones
Discontinued smartphones